Avižieniai [avʲɪ'ʒʲɪenʲɪai] is a village in Vilnius District Municipality, Lithuania,  west of the A2 Vilnius-Panevėžys highway. The village had the population of 2,125 as of 2011, which grew to 2,318 inhabitants in 2021 (according to the national census results) and is a centre of Avižieniai Eldership. During the Soviet period, a gardening farm (specialized kolkhoz) was formed in Avižieniai, which territorially also covered what is now Fabijoniškės and Pašilaičiai microdistricts in Vilnius. Avižieniai are famous for its manufacturing: motor vehicle bus manufacturer – ALTAS komercinis transportas with more than 200 employees, smaller steel furniture factory and other industry.

References

Villages in Vilnius County
Vilnius District Municipality